is a Japanese light novel series written by Kōshi Tachibana and illustrated by Tsunako. Fujimi Shobo published 22 volumes from March 2011 to March 2020 under their Fujimi Fantasia Bunko imprint. Yen Press holds the license to publish the light novel in English.

Five manga were published by Kadokawa Shoten and Fujimi Shobo in Monthly Shōnen Ace and Monthly Dragon Age. An anime television series adaptation animated by AIC Plus+ aired between April and June 2013. A second season by Production IMS aired between April and June 2014. An original anime film, Date A Live: The Movie – Mayuri Judgement, was released in August 2015. A spin-off light novel series, Date A Live Fragment: Date A Bullet, began publication in March 2017. A third season by J.C.Staff aired between January and March 2019. A fourth season by Geek Toys aired from April to June 2022. A fifth season has been announced.

Plot 

The series begins with a strange phenomenon called a "spatial quake" devastating the center of Eurasia, resulting in at least 150 million casualties. For the next 30 years, smaller spatial quakes plague the world on an irregular basis. In the present, Shido Itsuka, a seemingly ordinary high school student, comes across a mysterious girl at the ground zero of a spatial quake. He learns from his adoptive sister Kotori the girl is one of the "Spirits" from different dimensions who are the real cause of the spatial quakes to occur when they manifest themselves in the real world. He also learns Kotori is the commander of the airship Fraxinus, crewed by the organization Ratatoskr and its parent company Asgard Electronics.

Shido is recruited by Ratatoskr to make use of his mysterious ability to seal the Spirits' powers thus stopping them from being a threat to mankind. However, there is a catch: to seal a Spirit's power, he must make each Spirit fall in love with him and make her kiss him. Moreover, Shido and his companions face the opposition of the AST (Anti-Spirit Team), a special unit designed to suppress the threat posed by Spirits by eliminating them, which is backed by DEM (Deus Ex Machina) Industries, a conglomerate led by Sir Isaac Ray Pelham Westcott who intends to exploit the powers of the Spirits for his own agenda. As Shido successfully keeps sealing more and more Spirits, he gains allies to help him with his dates with other Spirits but also increases the competition among them for his attention and affection, much to his chagrin.

Publication 

Date A Live began as a light novel series written by Koushi Tachibana with illustrations by Tsunako. The first volume was published on March 19, 2011 under Fujimi Shobo's Fujimi Fantasia Bunko. Twenty-two volumes have been released in Japan. During their panel at the 2020 Crunchyroll Expo, Yen Press announced that they have licensed the light novel.

Media

Manga 

The series received a total of five manga adaptions, all of which were published by Kadokawa Shoten and Fujimi Shobo in Monthly Shōnen Ace and Monthly Dragon Age.

Anime 

The anime adaptation was directed by Keitaro Motonaga and produced by AIC Plus+. The series was streamed in lower quality on Niconico, with each episode available a week before its TV premiere. The first episode was streamed on March 31 and aired on Tokyo MX on April 6, 2013. The final episode was streamed on Niconico on June 16 and aired on Tokyo MX on June 22. The opening theme is titled  sung by sweet ARMS, a vocal group consisting of Iori Nomizu, Misuzu Togashi, Kaori Sadohara, and Misato.

Following the TV broadcast of the final episode of the first season, a second season was announced, which was set to air in April 2014. The opening theme is sung by sweet ARMS titled "Trust in You" and the ending theme is sung by Kaori Sadohara titled "Day to Story". The animation production was held by Production IMS. An unaired episode was bundled with the third volume of the Date A Live Encore short story collection was released on December 9, 2014.

The first and second season have been licensed by Funimation for streaming and home video release in North America and by Madman Entertainment in Australia.

In his Twitter account, Tachibana announced Date A Live would get a third new anime series. Animation production was held by J.C.Staff, with the cast and staff reprising their respective roles from the previous seasons. The series aired from January 11 to March 29, 2019. The opening theme is sung by sweet ARMS titled "I Swear", and the ending theme is sung by Erii Yamazaki titled "Last Promise". The third season ran for 12 episodes. Crunchyroll simulcast the third season, while Funimation produced a simuldub. In Australia and New Zealand, AnimeLab simulcast the third season.

On September 17, 2019, a new anime project was announced. It was later announced to be an anime adaptation of the Date A Live Fragment: Date A Bullet spin-off novels. Tachibana announced via his Twitter account that apart from the spin-off adaptation, the main series would get a new anime as well.

On March 16, 2020, it was announced that the series would get a fourth season. The season is produced by Geek Toys and was scheduled to premiere in October 2021, but was delayed to 2022 for "various reasons". Jun Nakagawa directed the fourth season, with Fumihiko Shimo writing the series' scripts, Naoto Nakamura designing the characters, and Go Sakabe returning to compose the series' music. It aired from April 8 to June 24, 2022. The opening theme is sung by Miyu Tomita titled "OveR" and the ending theme is sung by sweet ARMS titled "S.O.S". 
Following Sony's acquisition of Crunchyroll, the series was moved from Funimation to Crunchyroll. On April 21, 2022, Crunchyroll announced that the season would receive an English dub, which premiered the following day.

After the conclusion of the fourth season, a fifth season was announced.

Theatrical film 

An animated theatrical film was announced via the official Twitter account of the television series as the airing of the second television season concluded. On the event of "Date A Live II", the staff unveiled that the film will be titled as Date A Live: The Movie – Mayuri Judgement and premiered on August 22, 2015, with an original story supervised by the original light novel author, Koushi Tachibana. Nobunaga Shimazaki, the voice actor of Shido Itsuka, introduced a silhouette of the new title character, named . During the events of "Tohka's Birthday" on 10 April, Sora Amamiya was confirmed to be voicing Mayuri.

Video games 
A video game named  produced by Compile Heart and Sting Entertainment released on June 27, 2013 for the PlayStation 3. A promotional video was shown at Anime Contents Expo 2013. The game features a new original character named , voiced by Kana Hanazawa. A PlayStation Vita version of the game was released in on July 30, 2015, and features new characters and scenarios.

Another video game, titled , was released in June 26, 2014 for the PlayStation 3, featuring another new character named , voiced by Suzuko Mimori. A new installment for both past games, named  produced by Compile Heart and Sting Entertainment was released on July 30, 2015 for the PlayStation Vita. It is a de facto sequel with new characters and new scenarios. The game features the Yamai Sisters, Miku Izayoi, Rinne Sonogami, Maria Arusu, as well as Marina Arusu, and a new original character named , voiced by Ayane Sakura. A promotional video was shown at the events of Date A Fes II. An English version of Date A Live: Rio Reincarnation has been released on PlayStation 4 and Steam platforms on July 23, 2019. The PlayStation 4 version was censored, which caused criticism.

A fourth video game produced again by Compile Heart, titled , was scheduled to be released on July 18, 2019 for the PlayStation 4, in Japan. In addition to the standard addition, which will cost 7,776 yen at retail and yen via download, a 9,936 yen limited edition is also planned. The limited edition includes a Tsunako-designed box, special books (Koushi Tachibana-written short story, etc.), and a drama CD. Due to various reasons, the release date has been pushed back to September 24, 2020.

A free-to-play mobile game titled Date A Live: Spirit Pledge was released in China on September 21, 2018 for Android and iOS. A beta test of a global version started on July 26, 2020.

Reception 

The first volume of the first anime season placed eighth place amongst Blu-ray sales in Japan during its debut week within the Oricon charts. The PS3 game Date A Live: Rinne Utopia sold 23,340 physical retail copies within the first week of release in Japan. By October 2015, the series as a whole had sold over four million copies.

On June 12, 2015, the Chinese Ministry of Culture listed Date A Live II among 38 anime and manga titles banned in China.

See also

References

External links 

  
 Date A Live at Fujimi Shobo 
 

Date A Live
Book series introduced in 2011
2011 Japanese novels
2013 anime television series debuts
2014 anime television series debuts
2019 anime television series debuts
2022 anime television series debuts
2013 video games
2014 video games
2015 video games
Anime and manga based on light novels
Anime International Company
Censored television series
Cross-dressing in anime and manga
Crunchyroll anime
Dystopian anime and manga
Dystopian novels
Harem anime and manga
Fujimi Fantasia Bunko
Fujimi Shobo manga
Funimation
Geek Toys
Japan-exclusive video games
Japanese science fiction novels
Japanese science fiction television series
J.C.Staff
Kadokawa Dwango franchises
Light novels
PlayStation 3 games
PlayStation Vita games
Production IMS
Romantic comedy anime and manga
School life in anime and manga
Science fantasy anime and manga
Shōnen manga
Television censorship in China
Television shows based on light novels
Tokyo MX original programming
Upcoming anime television series
Video games developed in Japan
Works banned in China
Yen Press titles